Pietro Montanini (1619–1689), also called Petruccio Perugino, was an Italian painter of the Baroque period. He was born in Perugia and first apprenticed with the painter Ciro Ferri, then Salvator Rosa. Among his pupils in Perugia were Mattia Battini (born 1666) and Giuseppe Laudati (born 1672). His canvas of St Francis Xavier was painted for the Capella Decemvirale in Perugia. Francesco Busti also contributed to this chapel. His nephew, Giovanni Fonticelli, was also a painter.

References

Bruno Toscano, Un San Giovannino Inedito di Pietro Montanini, in La Storia e la Critica. Atti della Giornata di Studi per Festeggiare Antonino Caleca, Pisa: Pacini Editore, 2016.

1619 births
1689 deaths
17th-century Italian painters
Italian male painters
Italian Baroque painters
Umbrian painters